Ross LaBauex (born December 5, 1988) is an American soccer player.

Career

College and amateur
LaBauex attended Mark Sheridan Math and Science Academy, and then  Mount Carmel High School in Chicago, and played college soccer at the University of Virginia from 2006 to 2009. He also spent time with USL Premier Development League club Chicago Fire Premier in 2007, where he made 5 appearances. Before college, he was named 2006 NSCAA All-American.

Professional
LaBauex was drafted in the second round (23rd overall) of the 2010 MLS SuperDraft by Colorado Rapids. He made his professional debut on March 26, 2010, in Colorado's first game of the 2010 MLS season against Chivas USA.
Currently he works at Whitney M. Young Magnet High School as the assistant varsity coach. While his tactile coaching helps his players real benefit to the team is his role as a hype man.

LaBauex was waived by Colorado on June 28, 2012.

USL Pro club Rochester Rhinos signed LaBauex on March 14, 2013.

Honors

University of Virginia
NCAA Men's Division I Soccer Championship (1): 2009

References

External links

Virginia bio

1987 births
Living people
American soccer players
Virginia Cavaliers men's soccer players
Chicago Fire U-23 players
Colorado Rapids players
Rochester New York FC players
University of Virginia alumni
USL League Two players
Major League Soccer players
USL Championship players
United States men's under-20 international soccer players
Colorado Rapids draft picks
Soccer players from Chicago
Association football midfielders